Abadeh is a city in Fars Province, Iran.

Abadeh may also refer to:
 Abadeh, Bavanat, Fars Province
 Abadeh, Jahrom, Fars Province
 Abadeh, Kavar, Fars Province
 Abadeh, Marvdasht, Fars Province
 Abadeh, Kohgiluyeh and Boyer-Ahmad
 Abadeh, Mazandaran
 Abadeh County, in Fars Province